TOB or Tob may refer to:

 Tobruk Airport (IATA airport code)
 Dodge Center Airport (FAA LID airport code)
 Tob, a place mentioned in the Bible
 Top of book, the most competitively priced levels in the order book at a financial exchange
 Tournament of Bands
 The Orange Box, a video game compilation
 Traduction œcuménique de la Bible
 Times on base, a baseball statistic
 Total War Saga: Thrones of Britannia, a strategy game set during the Viking invasion of Britain and Ireland